Cornelius "Con" Leahy (27 April 1876 – 18 December 1921) was an Irish athlete, who won medals at the 1906 Intercalated Games and the 1908 Olympic Games for Great Britain.

Biography
Leahy was born in Creggane, outside Bruree, on the County Limerick-County Cork border, to Thomas Leahy and Mary McDonough. He was one of seven brothers, all of whom were sportsmen. His brother Patrick won the British high jump record in 1898 and went on to win Olympic medals in 1900. Another brother, Timothy, also jumped competitively.

In 1906, Leahy, Peter O'Connor and John Daly, were entered for the Intercalated Games in Athens by the Irish Amateur Athletic Association (IAAA) and Gaelic Athletic Association (GAA), representing Ireland. However, the rules of the games were changed so that only athletes nominated by National Olympic Committees were eligible. Ireland did not have an Olympic Committee, and the British Olympic Council claimed the three. On registering for the Games, Leahy and his fellow-athletes found that they were listed as United Kingdom, not Irish, team members. Leahy was subsequently involved in the protest at the flag-raising ceremony for the long jump when O'Connor scaled a flagpole in the middle of the field and waved the Irish flag. Leahy won the gold medal in the high jump with 1.775 meters, beating Hungarian Lajos Gönczy by 2.5 cm. After his victory was certain, Leahy still tried to reach 1.83 meters, but he failed at this height twice. Leahy then took part in the  hop, step and jump, which O'Connor won with 14.075 meters with Leahy coming second with 13.98 meters.

In the 1908 Olympic Games, Leahy again took part in the high jump. Three jumpers, Leahy, Géo André and István Somodi, shared second place with 1.88 meters behind the American Harry Porter, who won with 1.90 meters.

Later years and death

In 1909 Con and Patrick Leahy emigrated to the United States. Con died in Manhattan in 1921. In 2006, to mark the 100th anniversary of his Olympic medal win, a memorial was unveiled in Thomas Street, Limerick.

Record
 1906: Gold medal, High jump; Silver medal, hop, step and jump (triple jump)
 1908: Silver medal, High jump

References

Sources
 Ian Buchanan: British Olympians, Enfield 1991 
 Ekkehard zur Megede: The Modern Olympic Century 1896–1996 Track and Fields Athletics, Berlin 1999

1876 births
1921 deaths
Gaelic games players from County Limerick
British male high jumpers
British male triple jumpers
Athletes (track and field) at the 1906 Intercalated Games
Athletes (track and field) at the 1908 Summer Olympics
Olympic gold medallists for Great Britain
Olympic silver medallists for Great Britain
Irish male triple jumpers
Irish male high jumpers
Medalists at the 1908 Summer Olympics
Medalists at the 1906 Intercalated Games
Olympic gold medalists in athletics (track and field)
Olympic silver medalists in athletics (track and field)
Olympic male high jumpers